Sarah Grace Kustok (born December 17, 1981) is an American sports reporter who works for the YES Network and Fox Sports. In 2017, she became the first female full-time analyst for an NBA team's local TV broadcasts, when the YES Network promoted her from sideline analyst for Brooklyn Nets games.

Biography
Kustok began her career as an analyst and sideline reporter for ESPN and Fox Sports, covering college football, basketball (men's and women's), and high school football. She also worked as a TV sideline reporter for the Chicago Bulls, Blackhawks, Cubs, White Sox and Fire for Comcast SportsNet Chicago and was a substitute anchor for the network and filled in as sports anchor for WMAQ-TV. She has hosted College Sports Minute and was a freelance sports anchor/reporter for WFLD-TV. She also worked for Versus. She is the color commentator for the WNBA's Connecticut Sun home games. She also is the substitute anchor and contributor on FS1's First Things First. Kustok previously worked as a sideline reporter with the Brooklyn Nets (succeeding Michelle Beadle) before being promoted to TV analyst in 2017, making her the NBA's first ever female solo analyst. She also contributes to Nets Magazine.

DePaul statistics

Source

Personal life
Kustok grew up in Orland Park, Illinois, where she played high school volleyball and basketball.  She later attended DePaul University, where she played on the Blue Demons women's basketball team.  Her older brother, Zak, is a businessman who formerly played quarterback for the Northwestern Wildcats football team.

Sarah's father, Allan Kustok, was tried for the shooting and killing of Anita "Jeanie" Kustok, her mother, while she slept in their home in 2010. Sarah testified before the jury, and maintained her father's innocence in March 2014. Allan was convicted of first degree murder and is currently serving a 60-year prison sentence, where he is not eligible for parole.

References

 

1981 births
American women's basketball coaches
Brooklyn Nets announcers
Chicago Blackhawks announcers
Chicago Bulls announcers
Chicago Cubs announcers
Chicago White Sox announcers
Women's college basketball announcers in the United States
College basketball announcers in the United States
College football announcers
DePaul Blue Demons women's basketball coaches
DePaul Blue Demons women's basketball players
DePaul University alumni
Living people
Major League Baseball broadcasters
National Basketball Association broadcasters
National Hockey League broadcasters
National Football League announcers
Major League Soccer broadcasters
People from Orland Park, Illinois
Sportspeople from Cook County, Illinois
Television sports anchors from Chicago
YES Network
Fox Sports 1 people
American women's basketball players